Rakesh Chaurasia (born 10 January 1971) is an Indian flautist, who plays the bansuri, an Indian bamboo flute. He is the nephew of flautist Hariprasad Chaurasia.

He was awarded 'Indian of the Year 2017.

Discography
Call of Krishna – 2003
Call of Krishna 2 – 2005
Dor – 2006
Call of Shiva – 2007
Call of the Divine – 2013
Rupak Kulkarni and Rakesh Chaurasia – Raga Kirwani
Talvin Singh and Rakesh Chaurasia – Vira (2002), Sona Rupa UK/Navras Records
Abhijit Pohankar and Rakesh Chaurasia – Tranquility (2001), Sona Rupa Records

Awards 

 Indian Music Academy Award – 2007
 Aditya Birla Kalakiran Purasakar – 2008
 Guru Shishya Award – 2011
 IWAP-Pandir Jasraj Sangeet Ratna Award – 2013
 Pannala Ghosh Puraskar – 2013

References

External links
 
Official website
Interview on Hariprasad Chaurasia

Hindustani instrumentalists
Indian flautists
Living people
Musicians from Allahabad
Bansuri players
1971 births